A narrows or narrow (used interchangeably but usually in the plural form), is a restricted land or water passage. Most commonly a narrows is a strait, though it can also be a water gap.

A narrows may form where a stream passes through a tilted bed of hard rock lying between two softer beds: "[i]f the hard beds are vertical, so that their outcrop does not shift as erosion proceeds, a narrows is developed". Like a dam, this "raises the water level for a short distance upriver". A narrows is also typically a good location for trapping migrating fish. Furthermore, a narrows is "an important topographical feature for wind mixing", an effect where a wind chill may form ice while the surrounding temperature remains above freezing.

See also 
 Water gap
 Buffalo Narrows
 The Narrows, which separates Staten Island from Brooklyn and connects the upper and lower sections of New York Bay.
 The Narrows, which is the narrowest section of Zion Canyon in Zion National Park, Utah.

References

Fluvial landforms
Coastal and oceanic landforms